Ivo Harrington Whitton (9 December 1893 – 2 July 1967) was an Australian amateur golfer, who, along with Greg Norman, is the only Australian to have won the Australian Open five times (1912, 1913, 1926, 1929 and 1931).

Whitton was born in Moonee Ponds, Victoria, his father Percy Whitton was a senior public servant.

The younger Whitton took up golfing at the age of 14, joining his father in the Caulfield Golf Club (later the Metropolitan Golf Club) the next year, and winning the club championships three times. In 1911, he began working at a wool broking firm which allowed him time off to play golf during the off-season. In 1914, he competed at The Amateur Championship at Royal St George's Golf Club. He returned to Australia but then came back to England during World War I to serve with the Royal Garrison Artillery after being rejected by the Australian Imperial Force.

In 1912, Whitton won his first Australian Open championship, and went on to win four more in 1913, 1926, 1929 and 1931. He also won the Australian Amateur twice, the Victorian Amateur Championship five times, the New South Wales Amateur and the Queensland Amateur and Open.

In 1920, Whitton won the Helms Award as the most outstanding Australasian athlete. He returned to the wool industry as a wool appraiser for the Australian government, but ended up as a general manager for the Spalding sporting goods company.

The Victorian Golf Association established the Ivo Whitton Trophy in 1960 for the lowest average stroke score in designated tournaments held each year. Whitton himself presented the award to the inaugural winner, Kevin Hartley, who went on to win it a further eleven times. In addition, the Royal Melbourne Golf Club instituted the Ivo Whitton Cup in Whitton's memory. One of the streets in Kambah, a suburb of Canberra, is named Ivo Whitton Circuit.

After his death, Whitton was buried in the Cheltenham Memorial Park, Melbourne.

A group of local Melbourne golfers regularly play-off in a 9-hole stroke play event for the Ivo Whitton Perpetual Trophy at Burnley Golf Course to honour his memory.

Tournament wins
1912 Australian Open, Riversdale Trophy
1913 Australian Open. Riversdale Trophy
1919 Victorian Amateur Championship
1920 Victorian Amateur Championship
1922 Australian Amateur, Victorian Amateur Championship
1923 Australian Amateur, Victorian Amateur Championship, Queensland Amateur
1924 Victorian Amateur Championship
1925 Riversdale Trophy
1926 Australian Open, Riversdale Trophy
1928 Queensland Open
1929 Australian Open, New South Wales Amateur
1931 Australian Open

Team appearances
Kirk-Windeyer Cup (representing Victoria): 1927
Australian Men's Interstate Teams Matches (representing Victoria): 1912 (winners), 1913 (winners), 1920, 1921 (winners), 1922, 1923 (winners), 1924 (winners), 1926 (winners), 1927 (winners), 1929 (winners), 1930 (winners), 1931 (winners), 1932, 1933 (winners), 1935, 1938

References

External links
 Friends of Cheltenham and Regional Cemeteries Inc.

Australian male golfers
Amateur golfers
Golfers from Melbourne
Sport Australia Hall of Fame inductees
British Army personnel of World War I
Royal Garrison Artillery officers
Military personnel from Melbourne
People from Moonee Ponds, Victoria
Sportsmen from Victoria (Australia)
1893 births
1967 deaths